Pimelea drupacea, commonly known as cherry rice-flower, is a species of flowering plant in the family Thymelaeaceae and is endemic to south-eastern Australia. It is a shrub with elliptic leaves arranged in opposite pairs, and head-like clusters of white, tube-shaped flowers surrounded by two or four leaves.

Description
Flowering time is variously reported as August to October, mainly from September to January, or in late spring.

Taxonomy
Pimelea drupacea was first formally described in 1805 by Jacques Labillardière in his Novae Hollandiae Plantarum Specimen. The specific epithet (drupacea) means "drupe-like".

Distribution and habitat
Cherry rice-flower grows in moist, shady valleys and occurs on Wilsons Promontory in Victoria and is widespread and common in Tasmania, including on King Island.

Conservation status
This pimelea is listed as "critically endangered" in Victoria, under the Victorian Government Flora and Fauna Guarantee Act 1988.

References

drupacea
Endemic flora of Australia
Taxa named by Jacques Labillardière
Plants described in 1805
Flora of Tasmania
Flora of Victoria (Australia)